Gaitri Seetahal (born 23 October 1990) is a Trinidadian former cricketer who played as a right-arm off break bowler. She appeared in 3 One Day Internationals and 1 Twenty20 International for the West Indies in 2008. She played domestic cricket for Trinidad and Tobago. 

Seetahal made her only T20I appearance against the Netherlands, returning figures of 3/12 at the age of 17.

References

External links

1990 births
Living people
Trinidad and Tobago women cricketers
West Indian women cricketers
West Indies women One Day International cricketers
West Indies women Twenty20 International cricketers
Trinidad and Tobago people of Indian descent